Kamadhenu (Dharwad) is a village in the southern state of Karnataka, India. It is located in the Kalghatgi taluk of Dharwad district in Karnataka.

Demographics 
As of the 2011 Census of India there were 407 households in Kamadhenu and a total population of 1,772 consisting of 923 males and 849 females. There were 192 children ages 0-6.

See also 
 Dharwad
 Districts of Karnataka

References

External links
 http://Dharwad.nic.in/

Villages in Dharwad district